Baranus was a Hungarian prelate in the 12th century, who served as Bishop of Transylvania around 1139, during the reign of Béla II of Hungary.

Baranus was elected bishop sometime after 1134, when his predecessor Peter is mentioned. The name of Baranus appears only in the clause of a document related to the Bozók Abbey (present-day Bzovík, Slovakia) in 1139. His closest known successor Walter is first styled as Bishop of Transylvania only in 1156.

Notes

Sources

 
 

|-

|-

12th-century Roman Catholic bishops in Hungary
12th-century Hungarian people
Bishops of Transylvania